Upper Street is the main street of the Islington district of inner north London, and carries the A1 road. It begins at the junction of the A1 and Liverpool Road, continuing on from Islington High Street which runs from the crossroads at Pentonville Road/City Road and runs roughly northwards from outside the main entrance to Angel Underground station, then past the Business Design Centre, then splits at Islington Green (where Essex Road, formerly named Lower Street, branches off), then past The Screen On The Green cinema, past Islington Town Hall, ending at Highbury & Islington tube station on Highbury corner, where the A1 carries on as Holloway Road.

It contains many fashionable shops, pubs, restaurants and theatres.

History

The hilltop village of Islington originally consisted of two streets in addition to the High Street: Upper Street and Lower Street, which diverged from the High Street at Islington Green. Both date back to at least the 12th century. Henry VIII hunted duck in the ponds off Upper Street, while Walter Raleigh lived in Upper Street and owned a pub in Lower Street. Lower Street has since been renamed Essex Road.

The fields around Upper Street, with their close proximity to the growing city of London, were a major farming area. Islington was the home of the Royal Agricultural Hall, and a number of pubs and shops existed along the street to serve farmers and visitors to the hall.

In the 18th century Upper Street began to be redeveloped from an agricultural to a residential area. Ten houses were built in 1768 (later named Hornsey Row), and a further group built immediately south of Hornsey Row in 1792. A William Beverley (identified with William Roxby Beverley), the first to solve the problem of a "magic knight's tour" in chess (a variant on the knight's tour in which the numbered steps form a magic square) resided in these buildings, now replaced by Islington Town Hall.

In the late nineteenth century, the Upper Street area became notorious for its night-time entertainments. In 1870, Charles Dickens described the area as "amongst the noisiest and most disagreeable thoroughfares in London." and in 1885, it was widely known as "The Devil's Mile" on account of its prostitution, crime and the level of drunkenness.

Between 1936 and 1939, the former Methodist chapel in Providence Place, just off Upper Street, was the home of a drama school, the London Theatre Studio, directed by Michel Saint-Denis, with a conversion of the building designed by Marcel Breuer and F. R. S. Yorke. The students taught there included Peter Ustinov.

Upper Street is unusual in being one of the few streets in London to have a "high pavement". This was constructed in the 1860s to protect pedestrians from being splashed by the large numbers of animals using the road to reach the rear of the new Royal Agricultural Hall (repurposed in 1986 as the present Business Design Centre); as a consequence, the pavement is approximately 1 m above the road surface for some of the length of the street. One of the few other London streets with a high pavement, Liverpool Road, is the next road west of Upper Street and also serviced the Royal Agricultural Hall.

Places of interest
In recent years Upper Street has become extremely fashionable, and contains numerous pubs and restaurants, The pubs along the street are also popular meeting places for supporters going to the nearby Emirates Stadium, home of Arsenal Football Club.

Starting from the south, the first significant venue is a former tram shed, built in 1850 for commuter service to the City. By the 1940s the service had ceased, and the building was converted to an electricity substation, which was then closed by the 1970s. Following some years of lying derelict, it was reopened on 14 November 1979 as The Mall Antiques Arcade, and at its height housed over 35 dealers on its ground and lower ground floors. The building also housed other businesses, such as a restaurant in its upper floors, but the mall closed in 2008. Since 2013, the building has housed several chain shops. It is currently an Amazon Fresh store. The closure of the arcade reflects the reduction in the number of antique traders in the nearby Camden Passage, though a weekend antiques market is still held there. Moving north, there is the Business Design Centre, mentioned above as the Royal Agricultural Hall.

Islington Green is a small, triangular public park at the point where Upper Street splits, continuing north and northwest as a narrower street while Essex Road (formerly Lower Street) continues northeast. North of Islington Green, places of interest include the former Islington Chapel, now Angel Recording Studios and the Church of England parish church. St. Mary's was rebuilt in 1754 and its spire dominates the Islington skyline. The church is a major venue for performances of traditional religious music. 

The Little Angel Theatre is a children's puppet theatre in a former Temperance hall, behind the church. Directly opposite the church is the King's Head Theatre, founded in 1970 as the first pub theatre in the UK. The Almeida Theatre is an important independent theatre and producing house. The former Islington post office is now the entrance to the large scale mixed-use development "Islington Square", centred around a converted Royal Mail sorting office.

Further north is Islington Town Hall, where the joint first legal same-sex marriage in England took place on 29 March 2014. Adjacent to the town hall is Islington Museum.

Upper Street also contains the Hope and Anchor, one of the most important venues of the 1970s and 1980s punk and new wave scenes. The Stranglers' album Live at the Hope and Anchor was recorded here. The building is still in use as a music venue today. Further north, the eastern side of Upper Street is taken up by a long but narrow garden, Compton Terrace Gardens. Accessed from Upper Street through these gardens is Union Chapel, a church and concert and conference venue.

The radical left
In the 1970s and 1980s Upper Street was a focal point of the radical left. It was home to Sisterwrite, Britain's first feminist bookshop, as well as the Trotskyist Pioneer Books, the anarchist Rising Free shop (famous for stealing stock from other shops to sell in theirs) and the socialist Red Books. In the 1980s, Upper Street was home to the Islington Action Group for the Unwaged, a major far left campaigning and activist group, and to the squatter-run Molly's Cafe, a focal point for the anarchist and squatting movement. Upper Street made headlines on 23 July 1995, when the Reclaim the Streets movement took over the street, barricaded it to traffic and held a long party in the street.

Cultural references
Upper Street was one of the settings for local resident Douglas Adams's The Hitchhiker's Guide to the Galaxy series. The London-based sections of the later books are set in and around Upper Street, the home address of "Fenchurch". In addition, the character of Hotblack Desiato is named after a local estate agent.

References
Citations

'Sources

External links

Streets in the London Borough of Islington
Shopping streets in London
A1 road (Great Britain)
History of the London Borough of Islington
Islington